Det Vackra Livet are a Swedish indie dream pop band, signed to Labrador Records. The group's first single "Viljan" was released in early 2011, and a self-titled debut album followed in May of that same year.

History
Det Vackra Livet was formed in Gothenburg by brothers Henrik and Philip Ekström. The brothers are also founding members of Swedish dreampop group The Mary Onettes, with whom Det Vackra Livet shares much of its sound and influences. By contrast, The Mary Onettes' lyrics are performed in English, whereas Det Vackra Livet's lyrics are sung in Swedish.

Inspired by his grandmother's memories and Finland Swedish poet Claes Andersson, Philip Ekström wrote fifteen songs which would become material for the band during a creative outburst in late 2010.  The group's first single "Viljan" was released digitally on Labrador Records in January 2011. The group released a ten-track self-titled debut album in May 2011.  Det Vackra Livet translates to The Beautiful Life in English.

Discography

Albums
 Det Vackra Livet (3 May 2011)
 Labrador Records LAB138

Singles and EPs
 Viljan (Jan 2011)
 Labrador Records DLAB029

References

External links
 Det Vackra Livet on Labrador Records
 Det Vackra Livet Official Web site

Musical groups established in 2010
Swedish musical groups
Swedish alternative rock groups
Swedish indie rock groups
Dream pop musical groups
Shoegazing musical groups
2010 establishments in Sweden